Yat Malmgren (28 March 1916 – 6 June 2002) was a Swedish dancer and acting teacher, born in Gävle, Sweden to Gustaf Sigurd Eriksson and Signe Emma Maria Malmgren.

Born Gert Olof Sigurd Eriksson, he changed his surname due to a strained relationship with his father, to Malmgren, which was his mother's maiden name. He became known as Yat rather than Gert when he lived in England because of difficulties with the Swedish pronunciation of the letter G.

Early life and performing career
At 16 Malmgren intended to become a priest, but was dissuaded by his father. Instead in 1935 he began training as an actor with Julia Hakanson of the Svenska Teatern, and the following year as a dancer with Sven Trop, Ballet Master of the Royal Opera in Stockholm. In 1938 he went to Berlin to train with Eugenie Edwardova, former character dancer with Pavlova, and with Trude Engelhardt of the Mary Wigman company. While still in training he gave solo recitals throughout Sweden, followed in 1939-40 by solo recitals in Stockholm, Berlin, Warsaw and Paris where he began studying with Mme Preobrajenska. He was awarded the Gold medal at the Concours de la Danse in Brussels in 1939 and was spotted by Kurt Jooss who invited him to join Ballets Jooss based at Dartington Hall. It was here that he first met Rudolf Laban with whom he later collaborated in developing his theory of Movement Psychology. During the war he toured as a soloist with Ballets Jooss throughout the British Isles, Ireland, Canada, North and South America. He left the company in Buenos Ayres and spent the rest of the war period in Brazil, partnering the ballerina Nini Theilade in solo recitals and opening a movement school in Rio de Janeiro.

He returned to Europe in 1947 to give recitals in Sweden and Finland with Nini Theilade. In 1948 he was invited to join the International Ballet Company as premier danseur, and continued his training with Judith Espinosa in London, and Mmes Preobrajenska and Egorova in Paris. He appeared as 'the Baron' in Gaite Parisienne opposite the choreographer Massine, in his old role. A season at Teatro Municipal in Rio de Janeiro with Tatiana Leskova in 1950 was followed by tours throughout Britain and Europe.

In 1954, following a serious injury he was forced to retire as a dancer, and began teaching classes at the International School of Ballet in London. The actor Harold Lang persuaded him to start giving movement classes in the Anna Northcote studio in West Street, Covent Garden, and actors including Sean Connery, Diane Cilento, Patricia Neal, Gillian Lynne, Brian Bedford and Anthony Hopkins together with directors Tony Richardson, Bill Gaskill, Alexsander Mackendrick and Seth Holt all attended. He worked privately with Sean Connery for a year who appeared in 'Anna Christie' in Oxford, and particularly as Dionysus in Euripides's the Bacchae before his first success as James Bond.

Teaching career
Malmgren was a key figure at the Drama Centre London along with co-founder Christopher Fettes, John and Catherine Blatchley (Clouzot), Harold Lang and Doreen Cannon. His teaching approach drew from the applied psychology of movement developed by Laban. Malmgren's method of character development is concerned with a technique for expressing the inner state of a character through movement, and is a synthesis of Laban's theory of movement expression, C. G. Jung's character types (published in 1923) and key principles of acting established by Constantin Stanislavski.
Malmgren taught a number of famous actors including: Sean Connery, Pierce Brosnan, Colin Firth, Anthony Hopkins, Andrew Tiernan, Geraldine James, Helen McCrory, Paul Bettany, Russell Brand, Anne-Marie Duff, John Simm, Sean Harris, Andrew Pleavin, Diane Cilento, Michael Fassbender and Tom Hardy.

Publications
Christopher Fettes' book 'A Peopled Labyrinth - an Analysis of the Actor's Craft' (The Laban-Carpenter ‘Theory of Movement Psychology’ adapted and brought to completion by Yat Malmgren) (GFCA, 2015) describes Malmgren's system in depth, with numerous examples from classical plays and literature. An article describing the main features of Malmgren's approach to actor training, and bringing these up to date with aspects of contemporary thinking on cognitive science is Vladimir Mirodan, 'Acting the Metaphor - The Laban-Malmgren system of movement psychology and character analysis', Theatre, Dance and Performance Training Journal, Vol. 6, Issue 1, 2015. In his book 'The Actor and the Character' (Routledge, 2019) Mirodan also looks at Malmgren's work in the wider context of the relationship between the personalities of actors and the nature of the fictional character.   The system is also described in detail in two PhD theses. The first, entitled "The Way of Transformation (The Laban – Malmgren System of Character Analysis)" is by Vladimir Mirodan, Principal of the Drama Centre 2001-2011. This thesis is available online through the British Library. The second, entitled "The Knowing Body: Meaning and method in Yat Malmgren's actor training technique" is by Janys Hayes and is available through the National Library of Australia.

Several institutions around the world teach the method developed by Malmgren, which has come to be known as the "Yat" method of character analysis. These institutions include - in London, the Drama Centre, James Kemp's Effort Productions, the Giles Foreman Centre for Acting (GFCA also has centres in Paris, New York, Los Angeles), and Central School of Speech and Drama; Schott Acting Studio in Berlin; Gothenburg University - where Yat became an honorary doctor, in Sweden; the late Penelope Chater taught in Toronto and Australia for 30 years; Australia's National Institute of Dramatic Art in Sydney and the University of Wollongong in New South Wales; and Tom Bentley-Fisher's Yat/Bentley Centre for Performance in the United States and Canada. His work also influences training in Israel, Peru, Iran, Brazil, and Iceland, amongst many others.

References

External links

Fettes, C 1989, "The Drama Centre, London", in E Mekler (ed.), Masters of the Stage: British Acting Teachers Talk about their Craft, Grove Weidenfeld, New York, pp. 71–78, .
Kendall, D 1984, "Actor training in Australia", Meanjin, vol.43, no.1, pp. 155–160.
Mirodan, V., 2013, "After the Revolution - A History of Drama Centre, London", Part I - "A Hampstead Revolution", Central Saint Martins, University of the Arts London.
O'Connor, B 2001, "Mapping training/mapping performance: current trends in Australian actor training", in I Watson (ed.), Performer Training: Developments Across Cultures, Harwood Academic, Amsterdam, pp. 47–60, .

 

1916 births
2002 deaths
Swedish male dancers
Drama teachers
Academics of the Drama Centre London
Swedish expatriates in the United Kingdom